Karim Nayernia is an Iranian biomedical scientist and a world expert on stem cell biology and Personalized medicine.

He carried out pioneering work that has the potential to lead to future therapies for a range of medical conditions such as heart disease, Parkinson's disease and male infertility. His team was the first in the world to isolate a new type of stem cell from adult mouse testes (male sex glands), called spermatagonial stem cells. It was able to show that some of these stem cells, called multipotent adult germline stem cells (maGSCs), turned into heart, muscle, brain and other cells. Prof Nayernia and his team proposed that similar cells could be extracted from men using a simple testicular biopsy. On the basis of these cells, new stem cell techniques could be developed in order to treat a variety of illnesses.

Academic career
Karim Nayernia is an alumnus of the University of Göttingen, where he had defended his dissertation in 1993.  He worked at the university until 2006, when he started to work at the Newcastle University. In 2003, he got the professorship (Habilitation) in Molecular Human Genetics from Medical Faculty of Georg-August University in Göttingen and in 2006 Professorship for Stem Cell Biology from the Newcastle University Institute of Human Genetics.

In 2009, he created human sperm-like cells from male stem cells in the laboratory for the first time. Previously, in 2006, he used sperm created from embryonic stem cells to impregnate mice. The mice produced seven pups, although one died and the other six had health problems.

In 2010, he discovered a new marker for detection of breast cancer stem cells. This findings define this novel marker and its effector signaling pathways as key factors in the proliferation and survival of breast cancer stem cells.
He is working now on projects in the field of personalized medicine and director and founder of  the International Center for Personalized Medicine (p7medicine.com) and GENEOCELL company focusing on stem cell technologies and cell therapy. He is Director of International Stem Cell Academy which was established in 2016 (stemcell-academy.com) focusing on education of new scientists in the field of stem cell sciences at international level.
He is currently director of International Center for Personalized Medicine in Düsseldorf/Germany (www.icpm.center) and Director of International Stem Cell Academy (www.stemcell-academy.com).

References

External links
www.icpm.center
1993 dissertations at Institut für Humangenetik, ''University of Göttingen'
Newscientist.com

The Guardian article
The Guardian article
BBC article

Iranian medical researchers
Academics of Newcastle University
Living people
Year of birth missing (living people)
Biomedical engineers